Zanele Tshoko (born 15 February 1993) is a South African professional racing cyclist. She rode in the women's road race at the 2016 UCI Road World Championships, but she did not finish the race.

References

External links
 

1993 births
Living people
South African female cyclists
Place of birth missing (living people)
African Games silver medalists for South Africa
African Games medalists in cycling
Competitors at the 2015 African Games
21st-century South African women